CS Energy is an Australia-based electricity generating company fully owned by the Government of Queensland with its head office located in Fortitude Valley, Brisbane. The company was established in 1997 and employs more than 500 staff. Jim Soorley is the board chairman. The Chief Executive Officer is Andrew Bills.

The company's generation portfolio comprises coal-fired power stations. CS Energy has a trading portfolio of 3,535 megawatts in Australia's national electricity market. At present, the company owns and operates Kogan Creek Power Station and Callide B Power Station. CS Energy also owns Callide Power Station in a 50/50 joint venture with InterGen.

CS Energy was awarded A$32 million in 2010 to help construct Australia's first large-scale solar thermal project at Kogan Creek Power Station. Funding was provided by the Rudd Government under the Renewable Energy Demonstration Program. However, in March 2016, it was announced that CS Energy would 'pull the plug' on that project, at a loss of $40M to CS Energy and $6M to ARENA.

In 2020, Stanwell and CS Energy were accused of driving up prices by creating an artificial lack of supply.

Management
Martin Moore was the CEO in 2017.

See also

List of active power stations in Queensland
National Electricity Market

References

External links
CS Energy

Government-owned companies of Queensland
Electric power companies of Australia
Energy companies established in 1997
Companies based in Brisbane
Energy in Queensland
1997 establishments in Australia
Government-owned energy companies